Yeni Kavaflar Market is a covered bazaar in İzmir, Turkey.

Location
The -long west to east dimension of the market lies in parallel to the boulevard. There are 64 shops in the market.

History
During the Great fire of İzmir in 1922, just after the liberation of İzmir, most of the İzmir business center were burned down. In İzmir Economic Congress held on 17 February 1923-4 March 1923, reconstruction of the business center was planned. The Yeni Kavaflar Market was a part of this project and it was  completed in 1929. In 2009, it was restored by the Municipality of Konak, a secondary municipality of İzmir. Although the name Yeni Kavaflar means "New Shoemakers", there are many shops of diverse sectors such as leather dealers, furniture shops etc.

References

Bazaars in Turkey
1929 establishments in Turkey
Buildings and structures in İzmir
Economy of İzmir
Konak District
Buildings and structures completed in 1929